The canton of Le Puy-en-Velay-3 is an administrative division of the Haute-Loire department, south-central France. It was created at the French canton reorganisation which came into effect in March 2015. Its seat is in Le Puy-en-Velay.

It consists of the following communes:
Blavozy
Brives-Charensac
Le Puy-en-Velay (partly)
Saint-Germain-Laprade

References

Cantons of Haute-Loire